The 11th edition of World Para Ice Hockey Championships (originally named IPC Ice Sledge Hockey World Championships) was held in 2021.

The main event (Tournament A) was hosted by Ostrava, Czech Republic from 19 to 26 June 2021. It was the third time Ostrava hosted the Championships, previously hosting in 2019 and 2009.

Format
In Tournament A the contestants are divided into two groups based on their ranking. The top two teams from Group A advanced directly into semi-finals while the remaining two teams together with the best two teams from Group B advanced to quarter-finals.

Tournament A

Venue

Preliminary round
All times are local (UTC+2).

Group A

Group B

Playoff round

Bracket

Quarterfinals

Semifinals

Seventh place game

Fifth place game

Bronze medal game

Final

Final standings

Awards and statistics

Awards
Best players selected by the Directorate:
Best Goaltender:  Dominic Larocque
Best Defenceman:  Liam Hickey
Best Forward:  Brody Roybal
Source: IPC

MVP:  Brody Roybal
Source: IPC

Scoring leaders
List shows the top skaters sorted by points, then goals.

GP = Games played; G = Goals; A = Assists; Pts = Points; +/− = Plus/minus; PIM = Penalties in minutes; POS = Position
Source: IPC

Leading goaltenders
Only the top five goaltenders, based on save percentage, who have played at least 40% of their team's minutes, are included in this list.

TOI = Time on Ice (minutes:seconds); SA = Shots against; GA = Goals against; GAA = Goals against average; Sv% = Save percentage; SO = Shutouts
Source: IPC

Tournament B

Results

All times are local (UTC+2).

References

External links 
 
 Results book – A-Pool
 Results book – B-Pool

World Para Ice Hockey Championships - Men's
World Para Ice Hockey Championships
Sport in Ostrava
International ice hockey competitions hosted by the Czech Republic
sled
World Para Ice Hockey